Lottery is a 2009 Bollywood romance thriller movie starring Abhijeet Sawant, Manisha Kelkar, and Rucha Gujarati in lead roles. The movie is produced by Govind Satnam, directed by Hemant Prabhu and story is written by Aadesh K. Arjun.

Plot
The movie revolves around a love triangle. The male is attracted to two females and wins a lottery. To win again, he must consider killing one of the two females.

Cast
 Abhijeet Sawant as Rohit Awasthi 
 Gufi Paintal as Rustamji Batliwala
 Jaywant Wadkar
 Manisha Kelkar as Simran Kapoor 
 Manasi Deshmukh as Nurse Monica 
 Mukesh Tiwari as Raja Thakur 
 Nassar Abdulla as Rohit's Boss
 Nitin Kadam
 Rana Jung Bahadur as Sharma
 Rucha Gujarati as Soha
 Sanjay Narvekar
 Sharmila Goenka as an item number

Soundtrack

See also

 Abhijeet Sawant
 Rucha Gujarati

References

External links

2000s Hindi-language films
Indian romantic thriller films
2009 thriller films
2009 films
Films scored by Surinder Sodhi
Films about lotteries
Hindi-language thriller films